Courtin' Time may refer to:

 Courtin' Time, a 1951 film by Alfred Drake
 "Courtin' Time", a 1996 song from Emancipation by Prince